Ples sa Zvezdama is a Serbian dance competition show scheduled to air in March 2014. It is a Serbian version of Dancing with the Stars. The show was announced by Prva on January 30, 2014.

The contestant pairs consist of a celebrity paired with a professional dancer. Past celebrity contestants include professional and Olympic athletes, supermodels, actors and singers. Each couple performs predetermined dances and competes against the others for judges' points and audience votes. The couple receiving the lowest combined total of judges' points and audience votes is eliminated each week until only the champion dance pair remains.

There are fourteen contestants in the first season. Season one judges will be Nikola Mandić, Marija Prelević, Aleksandar Josipović, and Konstantin Kostjukov.

Series

References

 
2014 Serbian television series debuts
Serbian reality television series
Non-British television series based on British television series
Prva Srpska Televizija original programming